The Asia Pacific Greens Federation (APGF) (formerly the Asia Pacific Greens Network) is a federation of national Green parties and related organisations in countries in the Pacific Ocean and Asia, and is one of the four Federations that constitute the Global Greens.

The Federation's purpose is to promote and implement the Global Greens Charter by providing and promoting support to, coordination of, and collaboration between its member Green political parties.

The Federation is governed by APGF Council, which meets monthly and serves as the Board of Directors, and APGF Congress, which meets approximately every 5 years. APGF is led by two co-Convenors, the General Secretary, and the Treasurer. Along with other members appointed by APGF Council, these officers comprise the Management and Administration Committee, which oversees day-to-day operations.

The third Asia-Pacific Greens Congress was held in Wellington, New Zealand from June 12–14, 2015. One of the greatest achievements of the Congress was adoption of the Asia-Pacific Greens Federation Constitution. Adoption of the new Constitution marked the beginning of the Asia-Pacific Greens Federation, with a new structure and governance provisions reflecting its role within the international Green movement.

Full member parties 
Full member parties:
: 
Australian Greens
:
Bangladesh Green Party
: 
India Greens Party
Uttarakhand Parivartan Party
:
National Green Party of Iraq
: 
Greens Japan
:
Green Party of Lebanon
: 
Mongolian Green Party
: 
Nepali Greens Party
: 
Green Party of Aotearoa New Zealand
: 
Pakistan Green Party 
: 
Green Party Korea 
: 
Green Party Taiwan

Associate member parties 

Associate member parties:
: 
Green Aceh Party
Indonesian Green Party
Indonesian Green Union
: 
Jordanian Democratic Nature Party
: 
Palestinian Green Party
: 
Green Party of the Philippines 
: 
Green Party Solomon Islands

See also 

 Global Greens

References

External links
Asia Pacific Greens
APGN2010
Asia Pacific Greens Taipei Meeting 2010 - report
Asia Pacific Greens Kyoto Meeting 2005 - preview
Asia Pacific Greens Kyoto Meeting 2005 - report

Green political parties
Global Greens
Articles containing video clips